Leah Applebaum is an American voice actress and Broadway actress. She is best known as the voice of Nanami Kiryu from Revolutionary Girl Utena and Erika, the Grass type Gym Leader from the internationally acclaimed Pokémon series.

Career 
Applebaum first got into voice acting while working for a Broadway sketch comedy called My Thoughts Here in New York when she got a call from a casting director who was casting for the Hugo Award winning Think Like a Dinosaur, a Sci-Fi Channel program. Applebaum got the lead role of Kamala Shastri, which led her to be cast as a reporter in The Signal Man, which was adapted from the original story by Charles Dickens. The attention Applebaum received from her work on the Sci-Fi Channel eventually got her the major role of Nanami Kiryu from Revolutionary Girl Utena and Erika from the highly popular Pokémon series. According to the Dogasu's Backpack interview, Applebaum revealed that her Nanami voice was inspired from Buffy, a main character from the Family Affair TV series.

Voice roles

Anime 

 Erika and Suzie in Pokémon
 Nanami Kiryu in Revolutionary Girl Utena
 Nanami the Cow in Utena: The Movie

Internet Radio 

 Sci Fi Channel's Seeing Ear Theatre
 Princess Loo-Koo and Prunn in The First (and Last) Musical on Mars
 Computoid, Female Slave, and Rex in The Moon Moth
 Net-Girl and Phone Voice in The Nostalgianauts
 The Reporter in The Signal-Man
 Matilda the Waitress in Tales from the Crypt Episode 6: "Fare Tonight, Followed by Increasing Clottiness"
 Jane and Mistress Thornton in Time's Arrow, Time's Spiral
Kamala Shastri in Think Like a Dinosaur

References

External links 

Leah Applebaum on the Crystals Acids Database
Leah Applebaum at VoiceChasers

American voice actresses
Living people
Year of birth missing (living people)
21st-century American women